"Last Train Home" is a song recorded by American singer-songwriter John Mayer, and featured guest vocal from American country singer Maren Morris. It was released on June 4, 2021 as the fourth single from his eighth studio album Sob Rock. John Mayer wrote the song and produced it with Don Was. The song is Mayer's first new release in nearly two years since "Carry Me Away" (2019).

Background
John Mayer began teasing his new album with a series of TikTok videos that previewed new songs. The first song clip was Last Train Home, which Mayer soon followed up with a Wild Blue teaser. Mayer released Last Train Home on June 4, 2021, and announced that Sob Rock would be releasing on July 16 of the same year. 

On release day, Mayer shared four-track song lists, and he made "Last Train Home" as the lead single to released, and expressed it is "a slick rock production with an '80s polish, filled with keyboard stabs that remind of Toto, and guitar licks galore."

In an interview with The Wall Street Journal, Mayer explained the reason of the song '80s elements: "I asked myself, 'What music makes me feel like everything's going to be OK? And it's the music I listened to growing up in the '80s. There's a security-blanket aspect about that sound that reminds me of a safer time."

Composition
Rob Costa of Music talkers described the intro features "an 80's style synth Steve Winwood would be proud of, and conga drums mixed into the production, which is reminiscent of Toto’s mega 80’s hit, "Africa"."

Music videos
An accompanying "80s vibe" music video was released on June 4, 2021, directed Cameron Duddy and Harper Smith. It also features Mayer's band, including Toto's percussionist Lenny Castro and former Toto member Greg Phillinganes. The video shows Mayer, Morris and the band "recording their live performance of the song" at Union Station, located in Los Angeles, California. The video is highly reminiscent to that of Forever Man by Eric Clapton. The video won the Best Rock Video at the 2021 MTV Video Music Awards, It was the first MTV Award for Mayer.

Mayer released a second video of a "ballad version" on October 28, 2021, shot at Henson Recording Studios, where Sob Rock was recorded.

Credits and personnel
John Mayer – vocals, guitars, keyboards, producer, composer
Don Was – producer
Maren Morris – background vocals
Lenny Castro – percussion
Greg Phillinganes – keyboards
Sean Hurley - bass
Aaron Sterling – drums

Charts

Weekly charts

Year-end charts

References

2021 singles
2021 songs
John Mayer songs
Maren Morris songs
Songs written by John Mayer